Vijaipur is a town in Guna district of Madhya Pradesh in India.

Education
Schools located in Vijaipur include:
 Sri Sathya Sai Vidya Vihar, Vijaipur
 Kendriya Vidyalaya, Vijaipur

Economy
Vijaipur is primarily known as the site of one of India's largest fertilizer plants, owned and operated by National Fertilizers Limited. The Hazira-Vijaipur-Jagdishpur (HVJ) natural gas pipeline of GAIL, made the town well known in India.

Transport
Vijay Pur railway station is the main railway station of Vijaipur situated on Indore–Gwalior line under the Bhopal railway division.

References

Cities and towns in Guna district